Inchenhofen (also known as Leahad in the local tongue) is a municipality in the district of Aichach-Friedberg in Bavaria in Germany.

Leahad refers to the fact, that it is a pilgrimage site for Saint Leonard of Noblac. Until the Secularisation, it was the most important pilgrimage site of this saint in central Europe.

References

Aichach-Friedberg